Edward Dionicio Baca (July 27, 1938 – September 15, 2020) was a lieutenant general in the United States Army who was the first Hispanic to serve as Chief of the National Guard Bureau.

Early life
Edward Baca was born in Santa Fe, New Mexico, on July 27, 1938, into a family with a long history in New Mexico. His mother, Delphine Garcia, was indigenous to New Mexico and one of the first major female Mexican political activists in New Mexico. His father, Ernesto, was a veteran of both World War II and the Korean War.  Baca's ancestors arrived in Mexico City with the conquistadores in the 16th century and participated in the Oñate expedition that resulted in the founding of the Province of New Mexico.  Two of his great-grandfathers fought in the Civil War.

One of six children, Baca attended St. Michael's High School in Santa Fe, helping to pay the tuition by working on construction crews during summers.  His father died shortly after Baca's high school graduation.  Seeking to help Baca recover and begin a career, a cousin convinced him to join the National Guard, and on November 19, 1956 he became a member of Battery C, 726th Anti-Aircraft Artillery Battalion.

OCS and active duty service
Baca graduated from Officer Candidate School in July, 1962 and became a platoon leader in the 3631st Maintenance Company.  He soon applied for an overseas active duty assignment, and was deployed to South Vietnam. Upon his release from active duty on February 22, 1966, Baca returned to New Mexico and took command
of the 3631st.

National Guard leader
Baca continued to advance through the ranks in a series of command and staff assignments.  On January 30, 1977, he became the military personnel officer for the New Mexico Army National Guard.  He was later assigned as Assistant Deputy Chief of Staff for Personnel (G1).  In 1979 Baca was promoted to brigadier general and appointed the State Command Administrative Officer and Secretary of the General Staff.

In 1983 Baca was appointed by Governor Toney Anaya to be Adjutant General of the New Mexico
National Guard and promoted to major general.  His tenure was marked by a number of accomplishments, including taking part in an effort to modernize the National Guard nationwide, including the deployment of the Army's only Roland Air Defense battalion.  He also had a role in the fielding of Chaparral and Hawk missile battalions in the Army Reserve.  In addition, the New Mexico National Guard's Drug Demand Reduction Program was praised by the National Guard Bureau and used as a pilot program for similar programs in other states.

In 1994 Baca was promoted to lieutenant general and appointed Chief of the National Guard Bureau by President Bill Clinton.

In 1995, the United States Department of Defense planned to cut the number of National Guard combat divisions by 50% in order to allocate more funding to active duty forces.  Baca strongly resisted this attempt, replying to those in the Pentagon who called for a justification of Guard combat units' contribution to national security: "There were a lot of folks who said the same thing before World War II, 'Where's the threat?'"  By 1998, his efforts paid off when Guardsmen were needed to supplement the US complement for SFOR in Bosnia, and were available, enabling the National Guard to deploy its first combat unit overseas in nearly thirty years.  Of this time, Baca was able to say of the Guard's capacity: "We've got a reserve of untapped ability before we'd ever feel a pinch."

In 1998, Baca unsuccessfully attempted to have the Armed Services Vocational Aptitude Battery changed to eliminate what he perceived as cultural biases.

Baca remained Chief until his retirement on July 31, 1998.  After retirement he led a leadership training and consulting business in Albuquerque, New Mexico.

Personal life
Baca was married to Rita Hennigan of Muenster, Texas.  The couple had seven children -- Brian (1974-2015), Brenda, Karen Nielsen, Mark, Michelle, David, and Daniel. Four served in the military, including two who were members of the New Mexico National Guard. Baca died from leukemia on September 15, 2020 at the age of 82. He was buried at Santa Fe National Cemetery.

Education
Baca attended the College of Santa Fe, and in 1986 he received a Bachelor of Science degree in Liberal Arts from Regents College (now Excelsior University). He was a graduate of the Ordnance Officer Basic and Advanced Courses and the Command and General Staff Officer Course.

Awards
Among LTG Baca's decorations were:
  Army Distinguished Service Medal
  Legion of Merit
  Meritorious Service Medal
  Army Commendation Medal
  Army Reserve Component Achievement Award with Silver Oak Leaf Cluster
  National Defense Service Medal with one Bronze Service Star
  Vietnam Service Medal
  Armed Forces Reserve Medal with two Hourglass Devices
  Vietnam Gallantry Cross with Palm

Other awards
Honorary Doctorate of Law, New Mexico State University
Honorary Member, Military Order of the Purple Heart.

Notes

External links

Baca Group

1938 births
2020 deaths
Baca family of New Mexico
People from Santa Fe, New Mexico
People from Albuquerque, New Mexico
United States Army Command and General Staff College alumni
Excelsior College alumni
American people of Mexican descent
American people of Spanish descent
United States Army personnel of the Vietnam War
United States Army generals
Chiefs of the National Guard Bureau
Recipients of the Distinguished Service Medal (US Army)
Recipients of the Legion of Merit
National Guard (United States) generals
Recipients of the Meritorious Service Medal (United States)
Burials at Santa Fe National Cemetery
Deaths from cancer in New Mexico
Deaths from leukemia